Iowa Highway 15 (Iowa 15) is a north–south state highway in northern Iowa. The northern end is at the Minnesota border, where the highway continues north as Minnesota State Highway 15 near Fairmont, Minnesota. Prior to 1969, the route was known as Iowa Highway 44; it was renumbered to match the highway in Minnesota.

Route description

Iowa 9 and Iowa 15 overlap each other for two blocks before Iowa 15 turns north into Armstrong.

History
Parts of what is now Iowa Highway 15 were originally primary roads designated in 1926.  Primary Road 44 extended from Primary Road 10, now Iowa Highway 3 to Rolfe, while Primary Road 43 extended from Armstrong to the Minnesota state line.  By 1947, Iowa Highway 44 had been created along the same route Iowa 15 now occupies.  In 1969, then-Iowa Highway 44 was redesignated as Iowa Highway 15 to match Minnesota State Highway 15 at the state line.

Major intersections

References

015